The Denver Dude is a lost 1927 American silent Western film directed by B. Reeves Eason and starring Hoot Gibson, Blanche Mehaffey and Robert McKim. It was produced and distributed by Universal Pictures.

Cast
 Hoot Gibson as Rodeo Randall
 Blanche Mehaffey as Patricia La Mar
 Robert McKim as Bob Flint
 Slim Summerville as Slim Jones 
 Glenn Tryon as Percy the dude
 Howard Truesdale as Col. La Mar
 Mathilde Brundage as Mrs. Phipps
 Rolfe Sedan as Henry Bird
 Grace Cunard as Mrs. Bird
 Buck Carey as Red Quincy
 Gilbert Holmes as Shorty Dan

References

Bibliography
 Connelly, Robert B. The Silents: Silent Feature Films, 1910-36, Volume 40, Issue 2. December Press, 1998.
 Munden, Kenneth White. The American Film Institute Catalog of Motion Pictures Produced in the United States, Part 1. University of California Press, 1997.

External links
 
 

1927 films
Lost American films
Universal Pictures films
Films directed by B. Reeves Eason
1927 Western (genre) films
American black-and-white films
Lost Western (genre) films
1927 lost films
Silent American Western (genre) films
1920s American films